Federal Medical Centre, Gusau is a federal government of Nigeria medical centre located in Gusau, Zamfara State, Nigeria. The current Medical Director is Dr. Bello A. Mohammed.

CMD
The current Medical Director is Dr. Bello A. Mohammed.

References 

Hospitals in Nigeria